Sir Robert Townley Scott ISO (30 December 18413 August 1922) was a senior official in the Australian Public Service. He was appointed Secretary of the Postmaster-General's Department in 1901, the year of Australia's Federation.

Life and career
Scott was born on 30 December 1841 in Dorney, Buckinghamshire, England. He and his family emigrated to Australia in 1848, arriving in Brisbane in December of that year.

Scott was appointed first secretary of the new Australian Government Postmaster-General's Department, by fellow Brisbanite James Drake, prompting allegations of state bias.

Robert Scott died in his home in Brisbane on 3 August 1922.

Awards
Scott was awarded an Imperial Service Order in May 1903. In December 1909 he was appointed a Knight Bachelor.

References

1841 births
1922 deaths
English emigrants to Australia
Australian Knights Bachelor
Australian Companions of the Imperial Service Order
20th-century Australian public servants